Duke of Ciudad Rodrigo is a hereditary title in the Peerage of Spain, accompanied by the dignity of Grandee. It was conferred by Ferdinand VII on the British General Arthur Wellesley, then 1st Viscount Wellington, later 1st Duke of Wellington in 1812, after his important victory at the Siege of Ciudad Rodrigo that same year, as a victory title. As  all dukedoms but one

in the peerage of Spain, it has Grandeeship attached.

History

Historically, this Spanish dukedom is held by the successors of the 1st Duke of Wellington holding the title of Duke of Wellington, although this has not always been the case because of different succession laws. Traditionally, when titles were created, the first holder could determine how their title would pass: in the United Kingdom, almost all ducal titles were created with agnatic primogeniture, while Spanish titles usually passed either by male primogeniture or by agnatic primogeniture. This would later change with the 2006 reform to Spanish nobility succession, which enforced succession by absolute primogeniture to all titles.

In 1943, Anne Rhys (née Wellesley), the only daughter and eldest child of Arthur Wellesley, 5th Duke of Wellington, inherited the Spanish dukedom while having no rights to the British title of her family which passed to her uncle, after her younger brother was killed in action during the Second World War. In 1949 Anne renounced to the title in favor of her uncle Gerald Wellesley, 7th Duke of Wellington.

In 2010, The 8th Duke of Wellington & 9th Duke of Ciudad Rodrigo ceded the Spanish dukedom to his eldest child, Charles Wellesley, Marquess of Douro, and in accordance with Spanish procedure, the Marquess made formal claim to the title with the Spanish authorities on 10 March 2010. King Juan Carlos of Spain, through his minister, granted the succession of the dukedom to the Marquess of Douro by Royal Decree of 21 May 2010, as confirmed by the notice in the Official State Gazette of 12 June 2010. The new Duke of Ciudad Rodrigo succeeded his father as Duke of Wellington in 2014.

The heir apparent to the Dukedom of Ciudad Rodrigo is the 10th Duke's eldest child, Arthur Wellesley, Marquess of Douro. Lord Douro has fraternal twins, a first-born daughter, Lady Mae Madeleine Wellesley, and a second-born son, Arthur Darcy Wellesley, Earl of Mornington. Lady Mae is Lord Douro's heir apparent to the Spanish dukedom as the eldest child while the second born is the heir to the British dukedom as the eldest male, which could lead to a separation of these titles.

Dukes of Ciudad Rodrigo (1812–present)
 Arthur Wellesley, 1st Duke of Ciudad Rodrigo (1769–1852) from 1812
 Arthur Wellesley, 2nd Duke of Ciudad Rodrigo (1807–1884) from 1852
 Henry Wellesley, 3rd Duke of Ciudad Rodrigo (1846–1900) from 1884
 Arthur Wellesley, 4th Duke of Ciudad Rodrigo (1849–1934) from 1900
 Arthur (Charlie) Wellesley, 5th Duke of Ciudad Rodrigo (1876–1941) from 1934
 Henry (Morney) Wellesley, 6th Duke of Ciudad Rodrigo (1912–1943) from 1941. Upon his death in 1943, the title went to his sister Anne.
 Anne Rhys, 7th Duchess of Ciudad Rodrigo (1910–1998) from 1943, ceded the title to her uncle in 1949
 Gerald (Gerry) Wellesley, 8th Duke of Ciudad Rodrigo (1885–1972) from 1949, ceded the title to his son 1968
 Arthur Valerian Wellesley, 9th Duke of Ciudad Rodrigo (1915–2014) from 1972, ceded the title to his son 2010
 Arthur Charles Wellesley, 10th Duke of Ciudad Rodrigo (b. 1945) since 2010

See also
List of dukes in the peerage of Spain
List of current Grandees of Spain
Duke of Wellington
Prins van Waterloo
Duque da Vitória

Notes

 
Dukedoms of Spain

Grandees of Spain
Noble titles created in 1812
Noble titles created for UK MPs